Marsjøen is a lake in Folldal Municipality in Innlandet county, Norway. There is a dam at the south end of the lake which is used to regulate the water height for use in the nearby Einunna and Savalen hydro-electric power stations.

See also
List of lakes in Norway

References

Folldal
Lakes of Innlandet